Kaumakapili Church is a Gothic Revival church located at 766 North King Street in the Kapālama neighborhood of Honolulu, Hawaii. It was originally established on April 1, 1838, at the corner of Smith and Beretania Streets as a Protestant church for common people; the only existing church, the Kawaiahao Church, was attended by nobility.  A new brick and wood frame church building with two steeples was built for the church from 1881 to 1888; however, that building was burned along with large areas of Chinatown in an attempt to control an outbreak of bubonic plague. Construction began on a third church building at the current site in 1910; this church, which is still in use, was dedicated in 1911. A $2.4 million restoration project conducted by Mason Architects in 1993 rehabilitated the church, which had been extensively damaged by nature and vandalism.

The church was added to the National Register of Historic Places on May 5, 2008.

References

Churches on the National Register of Historic Places in Hawaii
Churches completed in 1910
20th-century churches in the United States
Gothic Revival church buildings in Hawaii
Churches in Honolulu
1838 establishments in Hawaii
National Register of Historic Places in Honolulu